Sir John Killick GCMG (18 November 1919 – 12 February 2004) was a British diplomat who was ambassador to the Soviet Union, and later ambassador to NATO.

Career
John Edward Killick was educated at Latymer Upper School, University College, London, and Bonn University. He served in the British Army during World War II, first in the Suffolk Regiment, and later in the 1st Airborne Division in which he commanded the 89th Field Security Section (Intelligence Corps) at Arnhem. He was captured by the Germans, and after release in 1945 he commanded the intelligence corps unit at Siegen.

Kilick joined the Foreign Office in 1946 and served with the Allied High Commission in Germany 1948–51, at Berlin, Frankfurt and Bonn. He was private secretary to the Parliamentary Under-Secretary at the Foreign Office 1951–54, served at the embassy in Addis Ababa 1954–57, then attended the Canadian National Defence College (then located with the Canadian Land Forces Command and Staff College) 1957–58. He served in the Western European department at the Foreign Office 1958–62,  attended the Imperial Defence College 1962–63, then was Head of Chancery at the embassy in Washington, D.C., 1963–68, and Assistant Under-Secretary at the Foreign and Commonwealth Office (FCO) 1968–71.

Killick was appointed Ambassador at Moscow in September 1971. Shortly after he arrived, the British government expelled 90 Russian intelligence officers, and Killick had to deal with the difficult Anglo-Soviet relations that followed. He returned to London 1973–75 as deputy to the Permanent Under-Secretary at the FCO, Sir Thomas Brimelow, and also Britain's Permanent Representative on the Council of the Western European Union. He was Permanent Representative to the North Atlantic Council (the governing body of NATO) 1975–79. In March 1979, after the murder of a bank employee near Killick's home in a Brussels suburb, it was reported that Killick had been the intended target of the Irish Republican Army.

Killick was appointed CMG in the New Year Honours of 1966, knighted KCMG in the Queen's Birthday Honours of 1971 and raised to GCMG in the Birthday Honours of 1979.

References

KILLICK, Sir John (Edward), Who Was Who, A & C Black, 1920–2007; online edn, Oxford University Press, Dec 2012

Obituary: Sir John Killick: High-flying envoy at the heart of Britain's cold-war diplomacy, The Guardian, 16 February 2004
Sir John Killick (obituary), The Telegraph, London, 14 February 2004
Sir John Killick: Ambassador to the Soviet Union whose cool nerves were tested in Cold War diplomatic tit-for-tat, The Times, London, 19 February 2004
Obituary: Sir John Killick, 1919 - 2004, Field Security Officer, 89 (Parachute) Field Security Section
Interview with Sir John Killick, British Diplomatic Oral History Programme, Churchill College, Cambridge, 2002
1st British Airborne Division officers

1919 births
2004 deaths
Graduates of the Royal College of Defence Studies
People educated at Latymer Upper School
Alumni of University College London
University of Bonn alumni
British Army personnel of World War II
Ambassadors of the United Kingdom to the Soviet Union
Permanent Representatives of the United Kingdom to NATO
Knights Grand Cross of the Order of St Michael and St George
Suffolk Regiment soldiers
Intelligence Corps officers
British Army officers
People from Isleworth
British World War II prisoners of war
World War II prisoners of war held by Germany